Roger la Honte or A Man's Shadow is a 1913 French silent historical drama film directed by Adrien Caillard and starring Georges Dorival, Paul Capellani and Henri Collen. It is an adaption of the novel of the same title by Jules Mary, which has been filmed a further four times since.

Cast
 Georges Dorival
 Paul Capellani 
 Henri Collen  
 Maria Fromet

References

Bibliography
 Goble, Alan. The Complete Index to Literary Sources in Film. Walter de Gruyter, 1999.

External links 
 

1913 films
1910s historical drama films
French historical drama films
French silent feature films
1910s French-language films
Films based on French novels
Films set in the 19th century
French black-and-white films
1913 drama films
Silent drama films
1910s French films